Harmony Presbyterian Church is a historic church on the north side of Highway 103, approximately  north of Clarksville in Harmony, Arkansas.  It is a two-story masonry structure with a stone cut basement, built out of cut stone blocks and covered by a hip roof.  A wood-frame square tower rises above the main entrance, topped by a flared pyramidal roof.  The main entrance and windows are set in pointed-arch openings, giving the building a Gothic flavor. It was built in 1915-17 for a congregation organized in 1844.

The church was listed on the National Register of Historic Places in 1994.

See also
National Register of Historic Places listings in Johnson County, Arkansas

References

Presbyterian churches in Arkansas
Churches on the National Register of Historic Places in Arkansas
Gothic Revival church buildings in Arkansas
Churches completed in 1915
Churches in Johnson County, Arkansas
National Register of Historic Places in Johnson County, Arkansas